Natada is a genus of moths of the family Limacodidae described by Francis Walker in 1855.

Description
Palpi extending beyond frontal tuft. Hind tibia with two pairs of spurs. Forewing with vein 7 from angle of cell. Veins 8 and 9 stalked. Hindwing with veins 6 and 7 from the cell, or on a short stalk.

Selected species
Natada arizana (Wileman, 1916)
Natada burnsi Epstein & Corrales, 2003
Natada caria (Druce, 1887)
Natada chaconi Epstein & Corrales, 2003
Natada covelli Epstein & Corrales, 2003
Natada delgadoi Epstein, 2004
Natada ferruginea (Walker, 1855)
Natada fusca (Druce, 1887)
Natada fuscodivisa Dognin, 1910
Natada nasoni (Grote, 1876)
Natada nigripuncta Barnes & McDunnough, 1910
Natada quadrata (Berg, 1882)
Natada rufescens Walker, 1855
Natada semivitrea (Schaus, 1920)
Natada senilis (Felder, 1874)
Natada simois (Stoll, [1780])
Natada singulara Epstein & Corrales, 2003
Natada subpectinata Dyar, 1906
Natada truncata Epstein & Corrales, 2003
Natada varablancana Epstein, 2004

References 

 , 2003, Revista de Biología Tropical 51 (2): 445-462. 
 , 2004, Zootaxa 701: 1-86. 

Limacodidae genera
Limacodidae
Taxa named by Francis Walker (entomologist)